Julie Beckman is an American architect who designed the National 9/11 Pentagon Memorial with her husband Keith Kaseman. The $22 million memorial, which includes 184 benches with names of victims of the September 11 attacks in 2001 inscribed and illuminated by reflecting pools, opened on September 11, 2008.

Early life and education
Beckman graduated from Morristown-Beard School in Morristown, New Jersey in 1991. She later delivered the school's Lehman Lecture and received its Distinguished Alumni Award in 2009.

In 1995, Beckman graduated from Bryn Mawr College in Bryn Mawr, Pennsylvania, with a degree in growth and structure of cities. In 2001, Beckman completed a master of architecture degree at the Graduate School of Architecture, Planning, and Preservation at Columbia University in Manhattan. Beckman worked as an architect at DeLacour & Ferrara Architects, P.C., in Brooklyn, New York, in 2001–02, and at Stephen Tilly, Architect, in Dobbs Ferry, New York, in 2002–03.

Kaseman Beckman Advanced Strategies

In 2002, Beckman and Kaseman formed the firm Kaseman Beckman Advanced Strategies (KBAS) to compete for the Pentagon Memorial contract. The Pentagon selected their proposal from among more than 1,000 entries from around the world, awarded them the contract in 2003. In 2012, the American Institute of Architects awarded KBAS a National Medal of Service (a gold medallion) at their Architects of Healing ceremony, which honored architects involved in 9/11 memorials and rebuilding efforts.

Beckman and Kaseman's firm has also several other notable awards. In 2011, the American Council of Engineering Companies awarded KBAS their National Honor Award. That year, the Illuminating Engineering Society of North America awarded the firm a Philament Award, and McGraw-Hill Construction selected them for Project of the Year in park/side/landscaping. The Design-Build Institute of America also awarded KBAS their Design-Build Excellence Award. In 2006, the Architectural League of New York named KBAS as a winner of the Young Architects competition for projects in the theme Instability.

Academia
Beckman taught in the Departments of Architecture and Landscape Architecture in the School of Design at the University of Pennsylvania in Philadelphia, Pennsylvania from 2005 to 2013. She also served as associate chair and director of student services for the Department of Architecture. In 2014, Beckman joined the faculty of the College of Architecture and Design at the University of Tennessee's (UT) main campus in Knoxville. She serves as their director of student services. Speaking about her architectural research and design activities, Beckman presented an invited lecture in the Church Memorial Lecture Series at UT on January 13, 2014.

Family

In 2006, Beckman married Kaseman, whom she met during graduate studies at Columbia University. They have one child.

References

American women architects
University of Pennsylvania faculty
Bryn Mawr College alumni
Columbia Graduate School of Architecture, Planning and Preservation alumni
Architects from New Jersey
Living people
Year of birth missing (living people)
Morristown-Beard School alumni
21st-century American architects
University of Tennessee faculty
American women academics
21st-century American women